The Macedonians of Romania are a recognised minority with full minority rights. As of the 2021 census, 1,089 ethnic Macedonians lived in Romania. They are mostly descendants of refugees of the Greek Civil War (1946–1949).

Immigration
The Greek communists formed the Slavomacedonian National Liberation Front in 1943, thus recognizing the Macedonian national identity, during the Axis occupation of Greece. However, the situation deteriorated after the communists lost the Greek Civil War (1946-1949), while the  Greek government did not recognize the distinctiveness of the Macedonian nation, that was formed at the same time. Thousands of ethnic Macedonians were expelled and fled to the Eastern Bloc countries. Many were evacuated to Romania. A large evacuation camp was established in the Romanian town of Tulgheș. It was there that many of the younger children were reunited with their parents. It is thought that 5,132 children were evacuated to Romania along with 1,981 men and 1,939 women. The group of children evacuated was the largest in Romania. There in Romania, the most provisions were set up for them across the entire Eastern Bloc, excluding Yugoslavia. That group of children would go on to form the recognized minority group of Macedonians in Romania. According to the 2021 Romanian census, 1,089 individuals declared a Macedonian ethnicity (536 men and 553 women). In the same census, only 201 individuals declared that they spoke the Macedonian language, including 115 men and 86 women.

Organisations
The Association of Macedonians in Romania was established in 2000 as an ethnic minority political party to represent the Macedonian community. The party has a seat in the Chamber of Deputies. The current member of the Macedonian minority in Romania is Liana Dumitrescu, who has served since 2004, when she replaced Vasile Ioan Savu, in office from 2000.  Dumitrescu heads the party, which forms part of the parliamentary group of national minorities. At the 2000 elections the group received 8,000 votes, and in 2004, 3 Macedonian political parties from Romania, lead and participated at election by AMR, obtained more than 25,000 votes. However two other Political Parties, Asociația Macedonenilor din Romania and Asociația Cultura a Macedonenilor din România also polled well with 9595 and 9750 votes respectively.

See also 

 Ethnic Macedonians
 Exodus of Ethnic Macedonians from Greece

References

External links 
 Association of Macedonians in Romania
  Ethnic Minorities of Romania
  AMR
  AMR Votes
  AMR in Parliament of Romania

Macedonian diaspora
Main